The Railer bat (Mops thersites) is a species of bat in the family Molossidae. It is found in Cameroon, Central African Republic, Republic of the Congo, Democratic Republic of the Congo, Ivory Coast, Equatorial Guinea, Gabon, Ghana, Guinea, Kenya, Liberia, Nigeria, Rwanda, Sierra Leone, and Uganda. Its natural habitats are subtropical or tropical dry forests and subtropical or tropical moist lowland forests.

One of the unique features of the Molossolid bats such as the railer bat is that they have two sets of parotid glands. This is uncommon as most species of bats have two sets of submandibular glands.

References

Mops (bat)
Taxonomy articles created by Polbot
Taxa named by Oldfield Thomas
Mammals described in 1903
Bats of Africa